The Orakzai are a Pashtun tribe native to the Orakzai Agency and parts of Kurram Agency located in the Khyber Pakhtunkhwa province of Pakistan. They speak the language of Pashto.

Location
The Orakzai belong to the Tirah valley located in FATA or what is now known as KPK Khyber Pakhtunkhwa. The Orakzais inhabit the mountains to the north-west and north-east of Kohat district, bounded on the north and east by the Afridis or Khyber Agency, on the south by the Bangash or Miranzai Valley and on the west by the Bangash country and the Safed Koh mountains.

History

Origins
The Orakzai tribes take their name, which literally means the lost son (Wrak Zoi), he was a lost and adopted by karalan, and after many adventures he married and settled in Tirah. One branch, the Ali Khel, has been traced to Swat, whence they were expelled by the other inhabitants and it is not improbable that the whole tribe consists of refugee clans of the surrounding races. They cultivate a good deal of the Khanki and Kurmana valleys in the winter, but in the hot months retire to the heights of Tirah, of which they occupy the southern half called the Mastura Valley.

Mughal era 

The Orakzais served in the Mughal army. The Bhopal State of India was established by Dost Muhammad Khan, an Orakzai commander in the Mughal army. His descendants, the Nawabs of Bhopal, were of Orakzai ancestry.

British era
The government of British India estimated that the tribe had 28,000 fighting men. They were the object of various British military expeditions, notably in 1855, 1868, 1869, 1891 and the Tirah campaign of 1897.

See also
 Orakzai Scouts

References

Karlani Pashtun tribes
Social groups of Pakistan